Rhinella granulosa, also known as granular toad and common lesser toad, is a species of toad in the family Bufonidae. The species was redelimited in 2009 and is now considered endemic to Brazil.

According to the International Union for Conservation of Nature (IUCN)—still using a broader definition for this species—the natural habitats of Rhinella granulosa are open areas, savanna, forests, and river shorelines. During the daytime they hide in holes in the ground. They feed on ants and termites. This adaptable species is not considered threatened.

References

granulosa
Amphibians of Brazil
Endemic fauna of Brazil
Amphibians described in 1824
Taxa named by Johann Baptist von Spix
Taxonomy articles created by Polbot